La Détente is a 2011 short French film directed by Pierre Ducos and Betrand Bey. It has won several prizes, including Best of show award at SIGGRAPH Asia 2011 and Best Animation award at the Sapporo International Short Film Festival. The film tells the story of a French soldier in World War I who becomes paralyzed with fear while in the trenches. He escapes in his head to an imaginary world where toys fight wars instead of humans. Eric Liu, chair of the Computer animation festival at SIGGRAPH Asia 2011, called La Détente a standout of the festival, saying "This animation short brings a unique and visually stunning computer-generated animation to the audience."

Awards 
 Jury Special Mention award - Larissa 2012, Greece
 Best Short Film award - Anirmau 2012, Spain
 Best International Short film award - Cortoons 2012, Rome
 Public award - Festival Cinecourtanimé 2012, Roanne France
 Best Short film award - Festival Ciné-Jeune 2012, St-Quentin France
 3rd Prize International Short Film award - Animfest 2012, Athènes
 Best Animated film award - L'ombre d'un court 2012, Jouy en Josas
 Official selection Clermont-Ferrand 2012, France
 Best of Show award - SIGGRAPH ASIA 2011, Hong Kong
 Prix de la Jeunesse - Festival national du film d’animation, Bruz France
 Jury Special Award - IAF, Istanbul Turkey
 Best Environment Design - View awards 2011, Turin Italy
 Best Animation award - 6th Sapporo International Short Film Festival, Japan
 Jury Prize - OFF Court Festival 2011, Trouville France
 Jury Special Mention - Les Percéides Québec
 Best Short film - Festival du film francophone d’Angoulême, France
 Official selection Annecy 2011, France

References

External links

Unifrance film site

2010s animated short films
2011 computer-animated films
2011 short films
2011 films
French animated short films
2010s French-language films
French World War I films
2010s French animated films
2010s French films